Closely Watched Trains is a 1966 Czechoslovak film directed by Jiří Menzel and is one of the best-known products of the Czechoslovak New Wave. It was released in the United Kingdom as Closely Observed Trains. It is a coming-of-age story about a young man working at a train station in German-occupied Czechoslovakia during World War II. The film is based on a 1965 novel by Bohumil Hrabal. It was produced by Barrandov Studios and filmed on location in Central Bohemia. Released outside Czechoslovakia during 1967, it won the Best Foreign Language Oscar at the 40th Academy Awards in 1968.

Plot
The young Miloš Hrma, who speaks with misplaced pride of his family of misfits and malingerers, is engaged as a newly-trained train dispatcher at a small railway station near the end of the Second World War and the German occupation of Czechoslovakia. He admires himself in his new uniform and looks forward, like his prematurely retired train driver father, to avoiding real work. The sometimes pompous stationmaster is an enthusiastic pigeon-breeder who has a kind wife, but is envious of train dispatcher Hubička's success with women. The idyll of the railway station is periodically disturbed by the arrival of councilor Zedníček, a Nazi collaborator who spouts propaganda at the staff, though he does not influence anyone with it.

Miloš is in a budding relationship with the pretty, young conductor Máša. The experienced Hubička presses for details and realizes that Miloš is still a virgin. At her initiative, Máša spends the night with Miloš, but in his youthful excitability he ejaculates prematurely and is unable to perform sexually. The next day, despairing, he attempts suicide, but is saved. A young doctor at the hospital explains to Miloš that ejaculatio praecox is normal at his age, recommending that Miloš "think of something else", such as football, and seek out an experienced woman to help him through his first sexual experience.

During the nightshift, Hubička flirts with the young telegraphist, Zdenička, and imprints her thighs and buttocks with the office's rubber stamps. Her mother sees the stamps and complains to Hubička's superiors.

The Germans and their collaborators are on edge, since their trains and railroad tracks are being attacked by partisans. A glamorous resistance agent, code-named Viktoria Freie, delivers a time bomb to Hubička for use in blowing up a large ammunition train. At Hubička's request, the "experienced" Viktoria also helps Miloš to resolve his sexual problem.

The next day, at the crucial moment when the ammunition train is approaching the station, Hubička is caught up in a farcical disciplinary hearing, overseen by Zedníček, over his rubber-stamping of Zdenička's backside. In Hubička's place, Miloš, liberated from his former passivity by his experience with Viktoria, takes the time bomb and drops it onto the train from a semaphore gantry, which extends transversely above the tracks. A machine-gunner on the train, spotting Miloš, sprays him with bullets, and his body falls onto the train.

Zedníček winds up the disciplinary hearing by dismissing the Czech people as "nothing but laughing hyenas" (a phrase actually employed by the senior Nazi official Reinhard Heydrich). The stationmaster is despondent because the scandal with Hubička and Zdenička seems to have frustrated his ambition of being promoted to inspector. Then a huge series of explosions happens just around a bend in the track as the train is destroyed by the bomb. Hubička, unaware of what has happened to Miloš, laughs to express his joy at this blow to the Nazi occupiers. Máša, who has been waiting to speak with Miloš, picks up his uniform cap, which has wound up at her feet, blown by the huge winds from the blast.

Cast

 Václav Neckář as Miloš Hrma
 Josef Somr as train dispatcher Hubička
 Vlastimil Brodský as councilor Zedníček
 Vladimír Valenta as stationmaster Lanska
 Jitka Bendová as conductor Máša
 Jitka Zelenohorská as telegraphist Zdenička
 Naďa Urbánková as Viktoria Freie
 Libuše Havelková as Lanska's wife
 Milada Ježková as Zdenička's mother
 Jiří Menzel as Doctor Brabec

Production
The film is based on a 1965 novel of the same name by the noted Czech author Bohumil Hrabal, whose work Jiří Menzel had previously adapted to make The Death of Mr. Balthazar, his segment of the anthology film of Hrabal stories Pearls of the Deep (1965). Barrandov Studios first offered this project to the more experienced directors Evald Schorm and Věra Chytilová (Closely Watched Trains was the first feature film directed by Menzel), but neither of them saw a way to adapt the book to film. Menzel and Hrabal worked together closely on the script, making a number of modifications to the novel.

Menzel's first choice for the lead role of Miloš was Vladimír Pucholt, but he was occupied filming Jiří Krejčík's Svatba jako řemen. Menzel considered playing the role himself, but he concluded that, at almost 28, he was too old. Fifteen non-professional actors were then tested before the wife of Ladislav Fikar (a poet and publisher) came up with the suggestion of the pop singer Václav Neckář. Menzel has related that he himself only took on the cameo role of the doctor at the last minute, after the actor originally cast failed to show up for shooting.

Filming began in late February and lasted until the end of April 1966. Locations were used in and around the station building in Loděnice.

The association between Menzel and Hrabal was to continue, with Larks on a String (made in 1969 but not released until 1990), Cutting It Short (1981), The Snowdrop Festival (1984), and I Served the King of England (2006) all being directed by Menzel and based on works by Hrabal.

Reception
The film premiered in Czechoslovakia on 18 November 1966. Release outside Czechoslovakia took place in the following year.

Critical response
Bosley Crowther of The New York Times called Closely Watched Trains "as expert and moving in its way as was Ján Kadár's and Elmar Klos's The Shop on Main Street or Miloš Forman's Loves of a Blonde," two roughly contemporary films from Czechoslovakia. Crowther wrote:What it appears Mr. Menzel is aiming at all through his film is just a wonderfully sly, sardonic picture of the embarrassments of a youth coming of age in a peculiarly innocent yet worldly provincial environment. ... The charm of his film is in the quietness and slyness of his earthy comedy, the wonderful finesse of understatements, the wise and humorous understanding of primal sex. And it is in the brilliance with which he counterpoints the casual affairs of his country characters with the realness, the urgency and significance of those passing trains. Varietys reviewer wrote:The 28-year-old Jiri Menzel registers a remarkable directorial debut. His sense for witty situations is as impressive as his adroit handling of the players. A special word of praise must go to Bohumil Hrabal, the creator of the literary original; the many amusing gags and imaginative situations are primarily his. The cast is composed of wonderful types down the line.

In his study of the Czechoslovak New Wave, Peter Hames places the film in a broader context, connecting it to, among other things, the most famous anti-hero of Czech literature, Jaroslav Hašek's The Good Soldier Švejk, a fictional World War I soldier whose artful evasion of duty and undermining of authority are sometimes held to epitomize characteristic Czech qualities:

In its attitudes, if not its form, Closely Observed Trains is the Czech film that comes closest to the humour and satire of The Good Soldier Švejk, not least because it is prepared to include the reality of the war as a necessary aspect of its comic vision. The attack on ideological dogmatism, bureaucracy and anachronistic moral values undoubtedly strikes wider targets than the period of Nazi Occupation. However, it would be wrong to reduce the film to a coded reflection on contemporary Czech society: the attitudes and ideas derive from the same conditions that originally inspired Hašek. Insofar as these conditions recur, under the Nazi Occupation or elsewhere, the response will be the same.

Awards and honors

The film won several international awards:

 The Academy Award for Best Foreign Language Film, awarded in 1968 for films released in 1967
 The Grand Prize at the 1966 Mannheim-Heidelberg International Filmfestival
 A nomination for the 1968 BAFTA Awards for Best Film and Best Soundtrack
 A nomination for the 1968 DGA Award for Outstanding Directorial Achievement in Motion Pictures
 A nomination for the 1967 Golden Globe for Best Foreign-Language Foreign Film

See also
 Czechoslovak New Wave
 List of submissions to the 40th Academy Awards for Best Foreign Language Film
 List of Czechoslovakia submissions for the Academy Award for Best Foreign Language Film

References
Notes

Bibliography
 Hames, Peter. The Czechoslovak New Wave. Second Edition, 2005, London and New York, Wallflower Press.
 Škvorecký J. Jiří Menzel and the history of the «Closely watched trains». Boulder: East European Monographs, 1982

Further reading
Menzel, Jiri & Hrabal, Bohumil (1971) Closely Observed Trains. (Modern Film Scripts.) London: Lorrimer

External links
 
 
Closely Watched Trains an essay by Richard Schickel at the Criterion Collection
Closely Watched Trains on Criterion Channel

1966 films
1966 comedy-drama films
1960s coming-of-age comedy-drama films
1960s war comedy-drama films
Best Foreign Language Film Academy Award winners
Czech coming-of-age comedy-drama films
1960s Czech-language films
Czech resistance to Nazi occupation in film
Czech war comedy-drama films
Czechoslovak black-and-white films
Films based on works by Bohumil Hrabal
Films directed by Jiří Menzel
1960s German-language films
Rail transport films
Czech World War II films
Czechoslovak World War II films
1960s multilingual films
Czech multilingual films
Czechoslovak multilingual films
German-language Czech films